James Sharrow (born January 31, 1985, in Framingham, Massachusetts) is an American professional ice hockey player. Retired in 2020. Jimmy is now the Assistant coach of the Worcester Railers of the Echl. As well as a defense player development coach and a mentor.

Playing career 
Sharrow was drafted 110th overall by the Atlanta Thrashers in the 2003 NHL Entry Draft from the Halifax Mooseheads.  Sharrow played for the Thrashers' AHL affiliate the Chicago Wolves and their ECHL affiliate the Gwinnett Gladiators.  On June 23, 2007, Sharrow was traded to the Vancouver Canucks for Jesse Schultz.

He re-signed with Vancouver for one more year in July of 08 before on December 9, 2008, he was traded to the Chicago Blackhawks for a conditional draft pick.  On November 11, 2009, he was signed by the Victoria Salmon Kings of the ECHL.

On July 21, 2010, Sharrow left for Europe and signed a one-year contract with Eisbären Berlin of the Deutsche Eishockey Liga.

After five seasons in Berlin, 3 DEL championships, 1 CHL championship, CHL best defensemen, Sharrow left Berlin as a free agent and signed a one-year deal with Grizzlys Wolfsburg on June 5, 2015.

After 3 years with Wolfsburg, making it to two DEL finals in 3 years. Sharrow signed with Heilbronn of the DEL2 league.

Career statistics

Regular season and playoffs

International

References

External links 
 

1985 births
Living people
American men's ice hockey defensemen
Atlanta Thrashers draft picks
Chicago Wolves players
Eisbären Berlin players
Gwinnett Gladiators players
Halifax Mooseheads players
Heilbronner Falken players
Manitoba Moose players
Ice hockey players from Massachusetts
People from Framingham, Massachusetts
Rockford IceHogs (AHL) players
San Antonio Rampage players
Victoria Salmon Kings players
Wheeling Nailers players
Grizzlys Wolfsburg players